Manis FM is a Malay language-radio station operated by Husa Network Sdn Bhd. Its headquarters are located in Kuala Terengganu, Terengganu.

History 
Manis FM began its operation on 20 June 1998. In the early years, Manis FM first transmitted to the city of Kota Bharu only. The station were at first aired on 88.7 FM and aired for only 18 hours a day. Its headquarters were at first located at Jalan Kebun Sultan in front of the Kelantan state Chinese business hall.

In 2003, Manis FM started broadcasting 24 hours a day after moving to its new headquarters at Wisma Manis. The frequency of Manis FM at Kota Bharu was changed to 90.6 FM. The station also expanded to several states, especially in the east coast states of Terengganu and Pahang. Manis FM also launched a website with a new user interface look. Manis FM can be also tuned in Southern Thailand, Redang Island & Perhentian Islands.

Since 2011, Manis FM is a unit of Husa Network Sdn Bhd. Manis FM subsequently relocated its broadcasting facilities to Kuala Terengganu while its frequencies remained unchanged.

Notable announcers 
 Mat Dan (moved to Molek FM)

Frequency

References

External links 
 

1998 establishments in Malaysia
Radio stations established in 1998
Radio stations in Malaysia
Malay-language radio stations